Lavatory – Lovestory is a 2007 Russian animated short film directed by Konstantin Bronzit, about a lavatory attendant who finds a flower bouquet in her tip jar. The film was nominated for an Oscar in the 81st Annual Academy Awards and won multiple awards at film festivals. It is also on the Animation Show of Shows.

References

External links
Lavatory Lovestory on IMDb

2007 films
Russian animated short films
Melnitsa Animation Studio animated films